Crown Prince Uigyeong (3 October 1438 – 20 September 1457), personal name Yi Jang and formerly called as Prince Dowon was a Crown prince of the Korean Joseon Dynasty. He was the oldest son of Sejo of Joseon and Queen Jeonghui, also the older brother of Yejong of Joseon. He was the spouse of Queen Insu and the biological father of Seongjong of Joseon.

Biography

He was the eldest grandson of King Sejong the Great, eldest son of seventh King Sejo of Joseon and father of ninth King Seongjong of Joseon. He was titled as Prince Dowon until his father's accession to the throne. In 1450, he married with the daughter of Han Hwak, a diplomat and politician who became Left or Second State Councillor during the Sejo era. 

Uigyeong and Insu had two sons, Grand Prince Wolsan (1454–1487), King Seongjong (1457–1494), and a daughter, Princess Myeongsuk (1455–1482).

In 1470, Uigyeong was posthumously honored as King Deokjong when his son, Seongjong accessed the throne, while his wife was honored as "Queen Insu" 인수왕비. Nevertheless, she had to wait until 1474 to be granted the Mother-of-the-King title, becoming Queen Dowager Insu (인수대비).

The tomb of Uigyeong is located at Gyeongneung Royal Tomb, Goyang (敬陵). This is a very simple one, since he was only a Crown Prince at his death in 1457. On the other hand, the 1504 tomb of his spouse was built in full regalia, and placed at the left of his tomb, since Insu was then the deceased Grand Queen Dowager, with the posthumous name Queen Sohye 소혜왕후.

Family
Father: King Sejo of Joseon (2 November 1417 – 23 September 1468) (조선 세조)
Grandfather: King Sejong of Joseon (15 May 1397 – 8 April 1450) (세종)
Grandmother: Queen Soheon of the Cheongsong Shim clan (12 October 1395 – 19 April 1446) (소헌왕후 심씨)
Mother: Queen Jeonghui of the Papyeong Yun clan (8 December 1418 – 6 May 1483) (정희왕후 윤씨)
Grandfather: Yun Beon (1384 - 1448) (윤번)
Grandmother: Lady Lee of the Incheon Lee clan (1383 - 1456) (인천 이씨)
Consort and their respective issue(s):
Queen Sohye of the Cheongju Han clan (7 October 1437 – 11 May 1504) (소혜왕후 한씨)
Yi Jeong, Grand Prince Wolsan (1454 – 21 December 1488) (이정 월산대군)
Princess Myeongsuk (1455 – 4 October 1482) (명숙공주)
Yi Hyeol, Grand Prince Jalsan (19 August 1457 – 20 January 1494) (이혈 잘산군)
Consort Gwi-in of the Andong Kwon clan (? - 1494) (귀인 권씨) — No issue.
Consort Gwi-in of the Papyeong Yun clan (귀인 윤씨) — No issue.
Consort Suk-ui of the Geochang Shin clan (? - 1476) (숙의 신씨) — No issue.

Popular culture
 Portrayed by Baek Sung-hyun in the 2011 JTBC TV series Insu, The Queen Mother.
 Portrayed by Kwon Hyun-sang in the 2011 KBS2 TV series The Princess' Man.

Sources

References

External links 
 Crown Prince Uigyeong @NATE 

House of Yi
1438 births
1457 deaths
15th-century Korean monarchs
Korean princes
15th-century Korean calligraphers
People from Seoul
Heirs apparent who never acceded